Carr House may refer to:

in the United Kingdom
Carr House (Bretherton, Lancashire, England)
Carr Houses, a hamlet in Sefton, Merseyside

in the United States

Raymond Carr House, Kingman, Arizona, listed on the National Register of Historic Places (NRHP)
Carr House (Benicia, California), NRHP-listed
Thomas Carr District, Thomson, Georgia, NRHP-listed in McDuffie County
Carr House (Monmouth, Illinois), NRHP-listed
William V. Carr House, Davenport, Iowa, NRHP-listed
Ben F. Carr Jr. House, Fulton, Kentucky, NRHP-listed in Fulton County
Robert P. Carr House, Bowdoinham, Maine, NRHP-listed
Carr-Jeeves House, Winchester, Massachusetts, NRHP-listed
Daniel Carr House, Haverhill, New Hampshire, NRHP-listed
John Carr House, Middlesex, New York, NRHP-listed
John Price Carr House, Charlotte, North Carolina, NRHP-listed
Patrick-Carr-Herring House, Clinton, North Carolina, NRHP-listed
John C. and Binford Carr House, Durham, North Carolina, NRHP-listed
Titus W. Carr House, Walstonburg, North Carolina, NRHP-listed
Andrew Carr Sr. House, Minot, North Dakota, NRHP-listed
George Carr Ranch House, Camargo, Oklahoma, NRHP-listed in Ellis County
Thomas Carr Farmstead Site (Keeler Site RI-707), Jamestown, Rhode Island, NRHP-listed
Dr. George W. Carr House, Providence, Rhode Island, NRHP-listed
Anna Carr Homestead, Bison, South Dakota, NRHP-listed
Jefferson Davis Carr House, Fort Pierre, South Dakota, NRHP-listed

See also
Carr's Hall, Terre Haute, Indiana, NRHP-listed
Carr's Hill, Charlottesville, Virginia, NRHP-listed
Martin W. Carr School, Somerville, Massachusetts, NRHP-listed